Nicolas Zdichynec (born 22 January 2002) is an Austrian professional footballer who plays as a midfielder for Vorwärts Steyr, on loan from Ried.

Career
Zdichynec is a product of the youth academies of Ebreichsdorf and Ried. In 2018, he was promoted to the reserves of Admira Wacker, and then their senior team in 2021 where he made his professional appearance in the last game of the 2020-2021 season against Altach. On 9 June 2021, he transferred to Ried, initially playing with their reserves. He joined Vorwärts Steyr for the 2022-23 season in the 2. Liga on 13 June 2022.

International career
Zdichynec is a youth international for Austria, having represented them from U15 to U18 levels.

References

External links
 
 OEFB Profile

2002 births
Living people
Footballers from Vienna
Austrian footballers
Austria under-21 international footballers
FC Admira Wacker Mödling players
SV Ried players
SK Vorwärts Steyr players
Austrian Football Bundesliga players
2. Liga (Austria) players
Austrian Regionalliga players
Association football midfielders
Austria youth international footballers